Swansea City bus station is a bus station serving Swansea, Wales. It lies immediately to the west of the Quadrant Shopping Centre.

The station has 20 stands for local bus services with three more serving national coach services. Coach services operated by National Express run westward to Llanelli, Carmarthen, and Haverfordwest and eastward to London, Birmingham, Cardiff, Bristol, as well as Heathrow Airport and Gatwick Airport. There is also a fast daytime service (First Cymru X10) connecting the bus station to Bridgend Designer Outlet and Cardiff city centre hourly (every 90 to 105 minutes on Sundays).

There is a taxi rank at the south end of the station.

History and redevelopment

The bus station opened along with the Quadrant shopping centre in 1979, replacing the old bus station opposite (next to the Grand Theatre). The bus station was becoming old and run down by the mid 2000s and plans were put forward by the local council to re-develop the site into a more modern bus facility.

In July 2008, it was announced that funding from the European Convergence programme was approved to help with the £11 million redevelopment of the station. On 1 August 2008 it was confirmed that work on the new bus station would begin in January 2009, but it was headlined in the South Wales Evening Post on 1 December 2008, that work would not start until May 2009. Work started on 13 June 2009 and the newly built bus station opened on 6 December 2010. New retail units were built within the bus station building but opened on a later date. These units include a Greggs bakery, Costa Coffee and a Co-operative store.

See also
List of bus stations in Wales
Transport in Wales

References

External links

Buildings and structures in Swansea
Bus stations in Wales
Transport in Swansea